Westfall is an unincorporated community in Pickaway County, in the U.S. state of Ohio. There is no relationship between the community and with Westfall High School, despite it having the same name. Some nearby rivers and creeks/ponds are the Scioto River and Hitler Pond. It is off of Ohio State Route 104.

History
Westfall was named for Abel Westfall, proprietor.

References

Unincorporated communities in Pickaway County, Ohio
Unincorporated communities in Ohio